A mobile communications vehicle (MCV) is a mobile self-sufficient communications vehicle capable of replacing remote radio communication facilities. The vehicle may carry equipment to operate UHF and VHF frequencies. An MCV can be driven to a location to fill in radio coverage gaps or to replace a damaged radio communications tower. Once deployed the MCV operates unmanned.

Equipment
Many MCVs are equipped with:
 Diesel generators
 Telephone connectivity
 Satellite navigation
 Satellite uplinks
 Radio transmitters and receivers

See also
 ECRV
 Outside broadcasting
 Satellite truck

References

Radio communications
Emergency vehicles